Lukas Benner (born 20 February 1996) is a German politician of Alliance 90/The Greens who has been serving as a member of the Bundestag since the 2021 elections, representing the Aachen II district.

Early life and education
Benner attended the Inda-Gymnasium in Aachen, where he received his Abitur in 2014.

Political career
In parliament, Benner has been serving on the Committee on Legal Affairs and the Committee on Petitions.

References

Living people
1996 births
People from Aachen
21st-century German politicians
Members of the Bundestag for Alliance 90/The Greens
Members of the Bundestag 2021–2025